Ministry of External Relations can refer to:

 Ministry of External Relations (Angola)
 Ministry of External Relations (Brazil)
 Ministry of External Relations (Dominican Republic)